Churaki is a rural locality (a selo) in Levichanskoye Rural Settlement, Kosinsky District, Perm Krai, Russia. The population was 160 as of 2010. There are 6 streets.

Geography 
Churaki is located 48 km south of Kosa (the district's administrative centre) by road. Demidovo is the nearest rural locality.

References 

Rural localities in Kosinsky District